"Blood on the Bricks" is a single by the Canadian rock musician, Aldo Nova. Released on his album Blood on the Bricks in 1991, the song climbed to #14 on Billboard magazine's Mainstream Rock chart. It was co-written by Jon Bon Jovi.

1991 singles
Aldo Nova songs
1991 songs
Songs written by Jon Bon Jovi
Songs written by Aldo Nova